Kornél Sámuel  (1883 in Szilágykövesd - 1914 in Uzsok) was a Hungarian sculptor noted for his delicate rhythm and lyrical approach to sculpting. He died at the beginning of World War I and was the first victim from the arts in World War I from Hungary.

In 1911 he traveled to Italy. His other notable works include "Eve", "Narcissus", and "David".

External links
Fine arts in Hungary

Hungarian sculptors
1883 births
1914 deaths
20th-century sculptors
Austro-Hungarian military personnel killed in World War I